Wang Xi (born January 9, 1984) is a professional Go player.

Biography
Wang was born in Kaifeng, Henan. He began playing Go at the very young age of 4. He was already enrolling in teams with professionals when he was only 8. In 1997, at the age of 13, Wang became a professional at the Zhongguo Qiyuan. The same year he entered the Chinese National Youth Squad. He was promoted to 3 dan in 1994, then 4 dan in 1999, and 5 dan in 2000. In 1999, he placed fifth at the National Youth Squad preliminary. 

The biggest moment of his career came in 2004 when he reached the Samsung Cup final. Wang put up a good fight against Lee Sedol, but couldn't come through with the win. He had once participated in the Samsung Cup before, in 2002. The last few years have been good for Wang, as he has placed second place 4 times, He won his first title, the Liguang Cup in 2006.

Promotion record

Titles & Runners-up

References

External links
 Interview

1984 births
Chinese Go players
Living people
People from Kaifeng
Sportspeople from Henan